The 1988 Campionati Internazionali di Sicilia was a men's tennis tournament played on outdoor clay courts in Palermo, Italy that was part of the 1988 Nabisco Grand Prix. It was the tenth edition of the tournament and took place from 26 September until 2 October 1988. First-seeded Mats Wilander won the singles title.

Finals

Singles
 Mats Wilander defeated  Kent Carlsson 6–1, 3–6, 6–4
 It was Wilander's 6th singles title of the year and the 32nd of his career.

Doubles
 Carlos di Laura /  Marcelo Filippini defeated  Alberto Mancini /  Christian Miniussi 6–3, 7–5

References

External links
 ITF – tournament edition details

Campionati Internazionali di Sicilia
Campionati Internazionali di Sicilia
Campionati Internazionali di Sicilia